This is the list of the members of the European Parliament for Greece in the 1979 to 1984 session. See 1981 European Parliament election in Greece for election results.

List

References

Greece
List
1981